The spotted darter (Etheostoma maculatum) is a species of freshwater ray-finned fish, a darter from the subfamily Etheostomatinae, part of the family Percidae, which also contains the perches, ruffes and pikeperches. It is endemic to the eastern United States where it occurs in the basin of the Ohio River. It inhabits fast-flowing rocky riffles of medium-sized and smaller rivers.

Habitat
The spotted darter lives in freshwater rives. These rivers are typically marked with the presence of boulders and other rocks. Adult spotted darters can be found in deeper sections of the river. The range of the spotted darter includes Ohio, New York and Pennsylvania. However, its range has greatly decreased. For example, in the state of New York only a few specimens have been observed in a span ranging several years In the state of Ohio, the darter is considered endangered.

References

Freshwater fish of the United States
Etheostoma
Fish described in 1841
Taxonomy articles created by Polbot